Herne Bay is a town in Kent, England.

Herne Bay may also refer to:

Places
Herne Bay, New Zealand, a suburb of Auckland
Riverwood, New South Wales, Australia (formerly known as Herne Bay)

Military
, anti-aircraft frigate of the British Royal Navy
Royal Naval Hospital, Herne Bay, Herne Bay, New South Wales, Australia

Other uses
Herne Bay F.C., based in Herne Bay, Kent, England, UK
Herne Bay Pier, the third pier at Herne Bay, Kent, England, UK
Herne Bay railway station, at Herne Bay, Kent, England, UK
Herne Bay High School, at Herne Bay, Kent, England, UK

See also

 Herne (disambiguation)